Jim McInally (April 6, 1948 – October 8, 2021) was a professional ice hockey defenceman. He was drafted in the first round, 7th overall by the Los Angeles Kings in the 1968 NHL Amateur Draft. He never played in the National Hockey League. McInally was born in Simcoe, Ontario.

Career statistics

References

External links

1948 births
2021 deaths
Canadian ice hockey defencemen
Hamilton Red Wings (OHA) players
Ice hockey people from Ontario
Los Angeles Kings draft picks
National Hockey League first-round draft picks
Sportspeople from Norfolk County, Ontario
Springfield Kings players
Toledo Blades players